Location shooting is the shooting of a film or television production in a real-world setting rather than a sound stage or backlot. The location may be interior or exterior.

The filming location may be the same in which the story is set (for example, scenes in the film The Interpreter were set and shot inside the United Nations Headquarters in Manhattan), or it may stand in for a different locale (the films Amadeus and The Illusionist were primarily set in Vienna, but were filmed in Prague). Most films feature a combination of location and studio shoots; often, interior scenes will be shot on a soundstage while exterior scenes will be shot on location. Second unit photography is not generally considered a location shoot.

Before filming, the locations are generally surveyed in pre-production, a process known as location scouting and recce.

Pros and cons

Location shooting has several advantages over filming on a studio set. First and foremost, the expense can often be far lower than that of constructing sets in a studio. The illusion of reality can also be stronger; on a set, it is hard to replicate real-world wear and tear, as well as architectural details, and the vastness of a city is difficult to recreate on a backlot.  The failure of Camelot (1967) caused American filmmakers to shift exterior shots from studio backlots to authentic locations.  The film was widely criticized for its cheap look because it was obviously filmed on an architecturally ambiguous set against the chaparral-covered hills of Burbank.

Shooting outside of the home country is sometimes used to bypass union rules, labor regulations, or work stoppages. It can also allow "frozen" currency to be used: the 1968 movie Kelly's Heroes was filmed in Yugoslavia using profits that had been made on movie exhibitions in that country but could not be exported.

Conversely, there are a number of reasons why a production may choose not to shoot on location. Shooting on a set gives the crew a greater control over the environment: a room may be created to the exacting specifications of the story, for example, and there is no need to shut down street traffic when shooting on a backlot. Additionally, a given location may have inconvenient restrictions. The convenience store where Clerks was shot was open during the day, so the crew could only shoot at night; this necessitated the shutters on the windows be closed to hide the fact that it was dark outside.

Location shooting often takes place close to the studio; in Hollywood films, this region is delineated in union agreements and is known as the studio zone. Many location shoots, however, are far from the home studio, sometimes on the other side of the world. In these instances, location shooting can provide significant economic development benefits to the area in which they are shot. Cast and crew heavily rely upon local facilities such as catering, transportation, and accommodations. A film that becomes a blockbuster hit can introduce movie audiences around the world to a visually breathtaking location that they were previously unaware of, as the Lord of the Rings trilogy did for New Zealand. This can boost tourism for years or even decades.

Practicalities

Location shooting usually requires a location manager, and locations are usually chosen by a location scout. Many popular locations, such as New York City in the United States, Toronto in Canada, and the Isle of Man, a crown dependency of the United Kingdom, have dedicated film offices to encourage location shooting, and to suggest appropriate locations to film-makers.

In many cases a second unit is dispatched to film on location, with a second unit director and sometimes with stand-in actors. These shots can then be edited into the final film or TV program alongside studio-shot sequences, to give an authentic flavor, without the expense or trouble of a full-scale location shoot. NYPD Blue, for example, was filmed primarily in Los Angeles, but used second unit footage of New York City for color, as well as featuring a small number of episodes filmed on location with the cast.

See also
Filming location
Location library
Set (film and TV scenery)
Filmmaking

References

External links

Cinematic techniques